This is a list of games published by Plaion subsidiary, Ravenscourt.

List of video games

References 

Plaion
Ravenscourt